Jingfu is a town under the administration of Santai County in Sichuan, China. , it administers the following three residential neighborhoods and 15 villages:
Neighborhoods
Jingfu Community
Fangya Community
Shuangle Community

Villages
Baishawan Village
Yingpanshan Village
Makouyan Village
Putisi Village
Jinlong Village
Tiangongshan Village
Huaishan Village
Zhuangyuanbei Village
Zhonghelou Village
Hexie Village
Xiangyang Village
Taihe Village
Xinghua Village
Wuquanshan Village
Songguanmiao Village

References 

Towns in Sichuan
Santai County